Tom's Planner is a web-based tool and application service provider for project planning, management and collaboration.

History 
Tom's Planner is based on Curacao. In November 2009, it announced its public beta launch on TechCrunch and moved out of beta in August 2010.

Software 

Tom's Planner is project management software that enables the creation of project schedules (Gantt charts) using a visual perspective. Tom's Planner uses the Freemium Business Model. Users can register for a free account or choose a paid version.

Tom's Planner is available in five languages and is used by thousands of users on a daily basis in more than 100 countries worldwide. Customers range from fortune 500 companies to small mom-and-pop shops.

Reviews 

Tom's Planner has been reviewed by PC World, TechCrunch, Lifehacker, and several other periodicals.

References

External links 
 Tom's Planner website
 Tom's Planner blog

Collaborative software
Web applications
Project management software